Merenre is an Ancient Egyptian name meaning "(the one) whom Ra has loved". It has sometimes suggested that the Greek Μενθεσοῦφις (Menthesouphis) is a rendering of this name, but it may more likely be a metathesized rendering of the name . Merenre is the throne name of two pharaohs of the 6th Dynasty during the late Old Kingdom period:

Pharaoh Merenre Nemtyemsaf I (2283–2278 BC),
Pharaoh Merenre Nemtyemsaf II (2184–2183 BC), grandson of Merenre I

See also 
 Pyramid of Merenre, burial pyramid of pharaoh Merenre I.

References